The Fantasy and Fugue on the chorale "Ad nos, ad salutarem undam", S.259, is a piece of organ music composed by Franz Liszt in the winter of 1850 when he was in Weimar. The chorale on which the Fantasy and Fugue is based was from Act I of Giacomo Meyerbeer's opera Le prophète.  The work is dedicated to Meyerbeer, and it was given its premiere on October 29, 1852.  The revised version was premiered in the Merseburg Cathedral on September 26, 1855, with Alexander Winterberger performing. The whole work was published by Breitkopf & Härtel in 1852, and the fugue was additionally published as the 4th piece of Liszt's operatic fantasy "Illustrations du Prophète" (S.414). A piano duet version by Liszt appeared during the same time (S.624).

Form
The piece consists of three sections:
 Fantasy: opens with the "Ad nos" theme and then turns quiet and contemplative. The theme returns and eventually a climax is reached. A second climactic passage follows, after which this section ends.
 Adagio: serves as a development section, beginning quietly, the theme moving to major keys now from the minor keys of the preceding section. The piece brightens a bit in the latter half of this section.
 Fugue: serves as the finale, but also, within the sonata-form, as the recapitulation and coda. Elements from the previous sections appear again. The piece ends with a triumphant coda, on full organ.

A typical performance lasts nearly half an hour, although performances of the composition by Liszt and by Winterberger lasted, according to contemporary reports, an average of forty minutes.

Transcriptions

Ferruccio Busoni prepared a piano arrangement which was published in 1897 by Breitkopf & Härtel. Alan Walker, Liszt's biographer, said that it "represents one of the pinnacles of twentieth-century virtuosity." Liszt at least once performed his own piano transcription, of which Walter Bache, his student, made an account in 1862. Liszt never seems to have notated such a version.

Hugo Kaun and Wilhelm Middelschulte created an arrangement for orchestra and organ. The premiere was on March 29, 1901, at Symphony Center, Chicago, conducted by Theodore Thomas, with Middelschulte as the organist. Marcel Dupré also created an organ-orchestra arrangement.

German conductor Florian Csizmadia wrote an orchestration for orchestra alone which was premiered on March 1, 2022 in Greifswald, Germany.

References

Further reading
 Todd, R. Larry. 1981. "Liszt, Fantasy and Fugue for Organ on 'Ad nos, ad salutarem undam'". 19th-Century Music 4, no. 3 (Spring): 250–61.

External links
Video
 . Alexander Frey performs Franz Liszt's largest keyboard work, the epic Fantasy and Fugue on "Ad nos ad salutarem undam" for organ. In this live performance, Mr. Frey begins the work with the actual chorale (the chorale of the Anabaptists, "Ad nos, ad salutarem undam") from Giacomo Meyerbeer's opera, "Le Prophète", on which Liszt based this piece.
 YouTube Diane Bish plays the finale Vivace on the Ladegast (1855) organ of St. John the Baptist and St. Lawrence Cathedral in Merseburg, Germany

Scores
IMSLP
 Bonnet-Schirmer edition score on IMSLP

Compositions by Franz Liszt
Compositions for organ
1850 compositions
Fugues
Liszt